Noapara Assembly constituency is an assembly constituency in North 24 Parganas district in the Indian state of West Bengal.

Overview
As per orders of the Delimitation Commission, No. 107 Noapara Assembly constituency is composed of the following: North Barrackpur municipality, Garulia municipality, Ichhapur Defence Estate, Barrackpur Cantonment, Mohanpur and Sewli gram panchayats of Barrackpore II community development block.

Noapara Assembly constituency is part of No. 15 Barrackpore (Lok Sabha constituency).

Members of Legislative Assembly

Election results

2021
In the 2021 election, Manju Basu of Trinamool Congress defeated her nearest rival,Sunil Singh of BJP.

2018 By-Election
Sunil Singh defeated his nearest rival Sandip Banerjee of BJP on Noapara by polls with a margin of 63018 votes with this All India Trinamool Congress snatched the seat from congress. Sunil Singh also Created a record of highest votes given to an individual till date in the Constituency.

2016
In the 2016 election, Madhusudan Ghose of the Indian National Congress defeated incumbent Manju Basu of the Trinamool Congress. But the demise of Madhusudan Ghosh resulted to re-election.

2011
In the 2011 election, Manju Basu of Trinamool Congress defeated her nearest rival K.D.Ghosh of CPI(M).

.# Swing calculated on Congress+Trinamool Congress vote percentages taken together in 2006.

1977-2006
In the 2006 state assembly elections, Kushadhwaj Ghosh of CPI(M) won the Noapara assembly seat in 2006 defeating Manju Basu of Trinamool Congress. Contests in most years were multi cornered but only winners and runners are being mentioned. In 2001, Manju Basu of Trinamool Congress defeated Madan Mohan Nath of CPI (M). Madan Mohan Nath of CPI (M) defeated Sris Das of Congress in 1996 and Ananta Roy of Congress in 1991. Jamini Bhusan Saha of CPI (M) defeated Sris Das of Congress in 1986, and Apurba Bhattachaya of ICS in 1981 and Congress in 1977.

1957-1972
Suvendu Roy of Congress won in 1972. Jamini Bhusan Saha of CPI(M) won in 1971 and 1969. Suvendu Roy of Congress won in 1967. Jamini Bhusan Saha of CPI won in 1962. Panchanan Bhattacharjee of PSP won in 1957. Prior to that the constituency was not there.

References

Assembly constituencies of West Bengal
Politics of North 24 Parganas district